The list of shipwrecks in May 1888 includes ships sunk, foundered, grounded, or otherwise lost during May 1888.

1 May

3 May

4 May

5 May

6 May

7 May

8 May

9 May

10 May

11 May

13 May

16 May

17 May

18 May

21 May

23 May

25 May

26 May

27 May

29 May

30 May

31 May

Unknown date

References

1888-05
Maritime incidents in May 1888